Platypepla is a genus of moths in the family Geometridae.

Species
Platypepla arabella Wiltshire, 1983
Platypepla bifida Herbulot, 1984
Platypepla spurcata (Warren, 1897)

References

External links
Natural History Museum Lepidoptera genus database

Macariini